Pen Singam is a 2010 Indian Tamil-language film directed by Bali Srirangam and produced by S. P. Murugesan. The film, based on M. Karunanidhi's novel Surulimalai, stars Uday Kiran,  Meera Jasmine, Richard, Rambha, and debutant Sudharsana Sen, while Vivek and Radha Ravi play supporting roles. The music was composed by Deva with cinematography by Vijay Ragav. The film released on 3 June 2010, coinciding with Karunanidhi's 87th birthday. The film also marked the final Tamil film of actress Rambha.

Plot
Surya (Uday Kiran) and Nagendran (Richard) are friends. Surya runs into a problem with Simha Perumal (Radha Ravi) and his gang. Nagendran made a speech about a woman way of getting married off with no dowry, as a woman way of getting married is education, so Mythilli (Rambha) falls for him. Mythilli is a rich woman of an inherited father. Surya and his mother help Nagendran get married. On Nagendran and Mythilli's first night, he demands her to give him money. Mythilli is shocked to find out that he is not the man of her dreams. She made a cheque but cancelled it, so Nagendran blackmails her by using the pictures. Surya is shocked that Nagendran has been a bad friend all his life. Nagendran invites Simha Perumal and his gang for a drinking party. Mythilli called Surya to stop him. There, Nagendran and Mythilli started to fight. In the meanwhile, Simha Perumal's gang shut down the power, Mythilli was on the floor shot in the head, and there was a gun in Surya's hand. Surya was confused as to how the gun got in his hand. He is accused of shooting Mythilli. Meanwhile, Meghala (Meera Jasmine) is on the case of Mythilli's death. What is Surya's fate like after?

Cast

 Uday Kiran as Surya
 Meera Jasmine as Meghala
 Richard as Nagendran
 Rambha as Mythilli
 Sudharsana Sen as Prabhavathy
 Vivek as Thirupathi
 Radha Ravi as Simha Perumal
 O. A. K. Sundar as Parasuraman
 Rohini as Surya's mother
 Thalaivasal Vijay
 Madhan Bob
 Y. Gee. Mahendra
 Besant Ravi
 Vagai Chandrasekar
 J. K. Rithesh (cameo appearance)
 Raghava Lawrence (special appearance in the song "Adi Aadi Asaiyum Edupu")
 Lakshmi Rai (item number)

Production
The film was launched in 2008 under the title "Neeyindri Naanillai" with Ilavenil of Uliyin Osai being announced as director. In a sudden turn of events, Ilavenil was replaced by a newcomer, Bali Srirangam, and the film had undergone a change of title with the makers naming it as "Pen Singam".
In this film, Meera Jasmine dons the role of an IPS officer for the first time in her career. The film is about women's fight for justice. Uday Kiran plays the male lead role in the film. Karthika is doing a prominent role in the film, as a police officer. Actor Richard is playing the role of an IFS officer in the film. Actress Rohini is playing the role of a Judge and Vivek will provide comedy sequences.

Soundtrack
The music was composed by Deva and released by Sony Music India.

Critical reception
Behindwoods rated the film 1 out of 5 and mentioned "Overall, Pen Singam has got a pretty neat script, which holds one’s attention, but lacks in contemporary value. A couple of holes in the script, a weak and meaningless comedy track and lackluster music come in the way of the Pen Singam’s roar". Rediff noted "Technically, the film manages to scrape through; it's the script that stumbles and almost grinds to a halt frequently, while the cast itself looks clueless and plain out of it, at times. Logic has gone for a toss as well and of reason, there's very little". Times of India wrote "Decades ago when Muthuvel Karunanidhi’s dialogues hit the silver screen, they were agents of change, awakening social consciousness. His latest film, which released on his 87th birthday, was hyped as a contemporary film. However, although the film deals with current day issues [..] , the dialogues are sorely lacking in the criticism and searing commentary of his early writings. Unlike his dialogues in films like ‘Parasakthi’ which moved audi-ences and inspired generations, this one is as awe inspiring as a zoo lion. To a large extent, the film's failure is also due to terrible act-ing by the lead pair". Hindustan Times wrote "The scripting and direction are so casual that the film often appears jerky, and with performances that are terribly amateurish, Penn Singam is awfully disappointing".

References

External links
 

2010 films
Films scored by Deva (composer)
2010s Tamil-language films
Films with screenplays by M. Karunanidhi